André Forcier (born Marc-André Forcier on July 19, 1947) is a Canadian film director and screenwriter. His work has been linked to Latin American magic realism by its use of fantasy but is firmly rooted in Quebec's reality. His unromanticized, even Rabelaisian, portraits of people on the fringe of society, especially in Bar Salon, Au clair de la lune, Une Historie inventée, Le Vent du Wyoming and The Countess of Baton Rouge, blend observations of minutia of everyday life with elements of fantasy and imaginary.

He became interested in film while still at college, won a Radio-Canada contest with his first 8-mm film, and in 1966 financed and produced his first 16-mm film.

Filmography
 1966: La mort vue par...
 1967: Chroniques Labradoriennes
 1971: The Return of the Immaculate Conception (Le Retour de l'immaculé conception)
 1974: Night Cap
 1974: Bar Salon
 1976: A Pacemaker and a Sidecar (L'Eau chaude, l'eau frette)
 1983: Au clair de la lune
 1988: Kalamazoo
 1990: An Imaginary Tale (Une histoire inventée)
 1994: The Wind from Wyoming (Le Vent du Wyoming)
 1998: The Countess of Baton Rouge (La Comtesse de Bâton Rouge)
 2004: Acapulco Gold
 2005: The United States of Albert (Les États-Unis d'Albert)
 2009: Je me souviens
 2011: Coteau Rouge
 2016: Kiss Me Like a Lover (Embrasse-moi comme tu m'aimes)
 2019: Forgotten Flowers (Les fleurs oubliées)

Awards
Forcier won the Prix André-Guérin in 1990. In 2003, he won the prix Albert-Tessier for an outstanding career in Quebec cinema. In 2010, he received Canada's Governor General's Awards in Visual and Media Arts He has received six Genie Award nominations. In the 2018 Prix Iris, he was honoured with the Iris Hommage for 50 years of contributions to the province's film industry.

References

External links

''This article incorporates text from the article André Forcier in the French Wikipedia.

Canadian screenwriters in French
1947 births
Film directors from Montreal
Writers from Montreal
Living people
Prix Albert-Tessier winners